is a Japanese football (soccer) club whose players are alumni of Gyosei School, in Toshima, Tokyo. It was founded in 1918 and won the Emperor's Cup in 1923. They currently play in the Tokyo Shakaijin Soccer League (level VII).

Honours
Emperor's Cup
1923

References

External links
 Official website

Football clubs in Japan
Association football clubs established in 1918
Emperor's Cup winners
Football clubs in Tokyo
1918 establishments in Japan